is a former Japanese football player.

Playing career
Kushino was born in Kumamoto on March 3, 1979. After graduating from high school, he joined J1 League club JEF United Ichihara (later JEF United Chiba) in 1997. However he could not play at all in the match behind Japan national team goalkeeper Kenichi Shimokawa until 1999. From 2000, he became a regular goalkeeper. However he got hurt in August 2005 and he lost regular position behind Tomonori Tateishi. Although he could hardly play in the match in league competition, he played many matches in J.League Cup and the club won the champions 2005 and 2006 J.League Cup. In 2007, he moved to Nagoya Grampus Eight on loan. However he could hardly play in the match behind Japan national team goalkeeper Seigo Narazaki. In 2008, he returned to JEF United. However he could hardly play in the match behind young goalkeeper Masahiro Okamoto and the club also was relegated to J2 League from 2010. He played many matches as regular goalkeeper in 2010, he could hardly play in the match from 2011. He retired end of 2013 season.

Club statistics

References

External links

1979 births
Living people
Association football people from Kumamoto Prefecture
Japanese footballers
J1 League players
J2 League players
JEF United Chiba players
Nagoya Grampus players
Association football goalkeepers